Mike Gabriel (born November 5, 1954) is an American animator and film director, best known for his work at Walt Disney Animation Studios and as co-director of the Disney animated films The Rescuers Down Under (1990) and Pocahontas (1995). He was born in Long Beach, California, although he grew up in various small towns like Salina, Kansas while moving around due to his father's Air Force job.

Gabriel was inspired with animation after watching Sleeping Beauty (1959) at the age of five. Soon after, he started drawing and practicing it for six hours every day to meet his goal as an Animation Director. It was in 1979 when he got his first chance to make his debut. Gabriel originally began his career as an assistant on The Fox and the Hound (1981). He later was assigned as a Disney animator on the animated short Fun with Mr. Future (1982). He was mentored under Eric Larson's training program, and went to work on The Black Cauldron (1985). He also served as an animator on The Great Mouse Detective (1986), Technological Threat and Oliver & Company (1988). Hendel Butoy joined Gabriel to direct The Rescuers Down Under, a sequel to the 1977 Disney animated film The Rescuers, while Eric Goldberg and Gabriel collaborated on Pocahontas.

In 2004, Gabriel directed an animated short for Disney entitled Lorenzo, a hybrid of traditional and computer animation about a lazy cat who has a spell cast on his tail that forces it to tango with him. Lorenzo was nominated for the 2005 Academy Award for Best Animated Short. It was also included in the Animation Show of Shows in 2004. He was hired to re-design the Walt Disney cinematic logo which plays before every Walt Disney picture since 2006.

Filmography

References

External links
 

1954 births
Living people
American storyboard artists
Animators from California
American art directors
American production designers
American animated film directors
American male screenwriters
Animation screenwriters
Film directors from California
Walt Disney Animation Studios people
People from Long Beach, California